"Watch That Man" is a song written by David Bowie, the opening track on the album Aladdin Sane from 1973. Its style is often compared to the Rolling Stones' Exile on Main Street. The mix, in which Bowie's lead vocal is buried within the instrumental sections, has generated discussion among critics and fans.

Recording
With the release of his album The Rise and Fall of Ziggy Stardust and the Spiders from Mars and his performance of "Starman" on the BBC television programme Top of the Pops in early July 1972, David Bowie was launched to stardom. To support the album, Bowie embarked on the Ziggy Stardust Tour in both the UK and the US. He composed most of the tracks for the follow-up record on the road during the US tour in late 1972. Because of this, many of the tracks were influenced by America, and his perceptions of the country.

"Watch That Man" was written in response to seeing two concerts by the American rock band New York Dolls. According to author Peter Doggett, the Dolls' first two albums were important in representing the American response to the British glam rock movement. Bowie was impressed with their sound and wanted to emulate it on a song. "Watch That Man" was recorded at London's Trident Studios in January 1973, following the conclusion of the American tour and a series of Christmas concerts in England and Scotland. Like the rest of its parent album, the song was co-produced by Bowie and Ken Scott and featured Bowie's backing band the Spiders from Mars – comprising guitarist Mick Ronson, bassist Trevor Bolder and drummer Woody Woodmansey.

Production
NME editors Roy Carr and Charles Shaar Murray considered "Watch That Man" the prime example of a collection of songs on Aladdin Sane that were "written too fast, recorded too fast and mixed too fast". They remarked on the "hurried shoddiness" of its production which "doesn't even sound like a finished mix". Co-producer Ken Scott however, speaking in 1999, defended the mix as the result of careful deliberation:

The label and Bowie's publisher MainMan initially requested a new mix with Bowie's vocal more upfront, but after Bowie and Scott complied, it was deemed inferior to the original.

Music and lyrics
According to author Nicholas Pegg, "Watch That Man" could be taken as "one of Bowie's most calculated changes of direction", to a more Stones-inspired dirty rock sound. Bowie himself suggested in the year of its release that it was a reminiscence of his introduction to the drug-fuelled American tour experience of late 1972. Rolling Stone magazine called it "inimitable Stones, Exile vintage. Mick Ronson plays Chuck Berry licks via Keith Richards, Garson plays at being Nicky Hopkins, Bowie slurs his lines, and the female backup singers and horns make the appropriate noises."

Live versions
 It was the third track on the live album Ziggy Stardust: The Motion Picture from the farewell concert at the Hammersmith Odeon, London, on 3 July 1973.
 A live version from the 1974 tour was released on David Live. This version was also released on the Sound + Vision box set and on the album Rock Concert.

Other releases
 It was the B-side of the Italian release of the single "Let's Spend the Night Together" in June 1973.
 It appeared on the Japanese compilation The Best of David Bowie in 1974.

Cover versions
Lulu recorded the song in July 1973, releasing it as the B-side of the single "The Man Who Sold the World", another Bowie track, on 11 January 1974. The band included Bowie on guitar, sax and backing vocals, Mick Ronson on guitar, Trevor Bolder on bass, Mike Garson on piano, and Aynsley Dunbar on drums. Produced by Bowie and Ronson, it has been described as having "a mix and backing vocal performance that easily outstrips the original". Lulu's cover of "Watch That Man" was also released on the albums From Crayons to Perfume, Heaven and Earth and the Stars and David Bowie Songbook (various artists).

Personnel
According to Chris O'Leary:
David Bowie – lead vocal
Mick Ronson – lead and rhythm guitar
Trevor Bolder – bass
Mick "Woody" Woodmansey – drums
Mike Garson – piano
Ken Fordham – saxophone
Linda Lewis – backing vocals
G.A. MacCormack – backing vocals
Juanita "Honey" Franklin – backing vocals

Production
David Bowie – producer
Ken Scott – producer, engineer

Notes

References

Sources

David Bowie songs
Lulu (singer) songs
1973 songs
Songs written by David Bowie
Song recordings produced by Ken Scott
Song recordings produced by David Bowie